In Zen, an  is a circle that is hand-drawn in one or two uninhibited brushstrokes to express a moment when the mind is free to let the body create.

Description
It is characterised by a minimalism born of Japanese aesthetics.

Drawing  is a disciplined-creative practice of Japanese ink painting, .

The circle may be open or closed. In the former case, the circle is incomplete, allowing for movement and development as well as the perfection of all things. When the circle is closed, it represents perfection, akin to Plato's perfect form, the reason why the circle was used for centuries in the construction of cosmological models (see Ptolemy).

It evidences the character of its creator and the context of its creation in a brief, continuous period of time. Drawing  is a spiritual practice that one might perform as often as once per day.

This spiritual practice of drawing  or writing Japanese calligraphy for self-realization is called .  exemplifies the various dimensions of the Japanese wabi-sabi perspective and aesthetic: fukinsei (asymmetry, irregularity), kanso (simplicity),  koko (basic; weathered), shizen (without pretense; natural), yugen (subtly profound grace), datsuzoku (freedom), and seijaku (tranquility).

In popular culture 

 The design of Apple Campus 2, Apple Inc.'s ring-shaped corporate headquarters, might also have been inspired by the ensō.
 Between 1995 and 2006, Lucent Technologies used a red ensō logo, designed by Landor Associates, meant to convey creativity and urgency. 
 A mobile smartphone app for meditation is called Ensō.
 Enso Gallery in Malibu, California features the zen-inspired enso paintings of local artist Tyler L. Barnett.

See also
 Wuji
 Abstract expressionism, a 20th-century American art movement
 Buddhism in Japan
 Dhyāna in Buddhism, a meditation practice in which the observer detaches from several qualities of the mind
 Ink wash painting, an East Asian style of brush painting that uses black ink
 Ouroboros, an ancient symbol depicting a serpent or dragon eating its own tail

References

Further reading

Concepts in aesthetics
Japanese aesthetics
Japanese calligraphy
Visual motifs
Buddhism in Japan
Expressionism
Zen art and culture
Zenga
Circles